Wired (stylized in all caps) is a monthly American magazine, published in print and online editions, that focuses on how emerging technologies affect culture, the economy, and politics. Owned by Condé Nast, it is headquartered in San Francisco, California, and has been in publication since March/April 1993. Several spin-offs have been launched, including Wired UK, Wired Italia, Wired Japan, and Wired Germany.

From its beginning, the strongest influence on the magazine's editorial outlook came from founding editor and publisher Louis Rossetto. With founding creative director John Plunkett, Rossetto in 1991 assembled a 12-page prototype, nearly all of whose ideas were realized in the magazine's first several issues. In its earliest colophons, Wired credited Canadian media theorist Marshall McLuhan as its "patron saint". Wired went on to chronicle the evolution of digital technology and its impact on society. 

Wired quickly became recognized as the voice of the emerging digital culture and a pace setter in print design. It articulated the values of a far-reaching "digital revolution" driven by the instant, cost-free reproduction and global transmission of digital information. It won several National Magazine Awards for both editorial and design. Adweek acknowledged Wired as its Magazine of the Decade in 2021. 

From 1998 to 2006, Wired magazine and Wired News, which publishes at Wired.com, had separate owners. However, Wired News remained responsible for republishing Wired magazine's content online due to an agreement when Condé Nast purchased the magazine. In 2006, Condé Nast bought Wired News for $25 million, reuniting the magazine with its website.

Wired contributor Chris Anderson is known for popularizing the term "the long tail", as a phrase relating to a "power law"-type graph that helps to visualize the 2000s emergent new media business model. Anderson's article for Wired on this paradigm related to research on power law distribution models carried out by Clay Shirky, specifically in relation to bloggers. Anderson widened the definition of the term in capitals to describe a specific point of view relating to what he sees as an overlooked aspect of the traditional market space that has been opened up by new media.

The magazine coined the term crowdsourcing, as well as its annual tradition of handing out Vaporware Awards, which recognize "products, videogames, and other nerdy tidbits pitched, promised and hyped, but never delivered".

History

The magazine was founded by American journalist Louis Rossetto and his partner Jane Metcalfe, along with Ian Charles Stewart, in 1993 with initial backing from software entrepreneur Charlie Jackson and eclectic academic Nicholas Negroponte of the MIT Media Lab, who was a regular columnist for six years (through 1998), wrote the book Being Digital, and later founded One Laptop per Child. The founding designers were John Plunkett and Barbara Kuhr (Plunkett+Kuhr), beginning with a 1991 prototype and continuing through the first five years of publication, 1993–98.

Wired, which touted itself as "the Rolling Stone of technology", made its debut at the Macworld conference on January 2, 1993. A great success at its launch, it was lauded for its vision, originality, innovation, and cultural impact. In its first four years, the magazine won two National Magazine Awards for General Excellence and one for Design.

The founding executive editor of Wired, Kevin Kelly, was an editor of the Whole Earth Catalog and the Whole Earth Review and brought with him contributing writers from those publications. Six authors of the first Wired issue (1.1) had written for Whole Earth Review, most notably Bruce Sterling (who was highlighted on the first cover) and Stewart Brand. Other contributors to Whole Earth appeared in Wired, including William Gibson, who was featured on Wireds cover in its first year.

Wired cofounder Louis Rossetto claimed in the magazine's first issue that "the Digital Revolution is whipping through our lives like a Bengali typhoon," yet despite the fact that Kelly was involved in launching the WELL, an early source of public access to the Internet and even earlier non-Internet online experience, Wireds first issue de-emphasized the Internet and covered interactive games, cell-phone hacking, digital special effects, military simulations, and Japanese otaku. However, the first issue did contain a few references to the Internet, including online dating and Internet sex, and a tutorial on how to install a bozo filter. The last page, a column written by Nicholas Negroponte, was written in the style of an email message but contained obviously fake, non-standard email addresses. By the third issue in the fall of 1993, the "Net Surf" column began listing interesting FTP sites, Usenet newsgroups, and email addresses, at a time when the numbers of these things were small and this information was still extremely novel to the public. Wired was among the first magazines to list the email address of its authors and contributors.

Associate publisher Kathleen Lyman (formerly of News Corporation and Ziff Davis) was brought on board to launch Wired with an advertising base of major technology and consumer advertisers. Lyman, along with Simon Ferguson (Wireds first advertising manager), introduced revolutionary ad campaigns by a diverse group of industry leaderssuch as Apple Computer, Intel, Sony, Calvin Klein, and Absolutto the readers of the first technology publication with a lifestyle slant.

The magazine was quickly followed by a companion website (HotWired), a book publishing division (HardWired), a Japanese edition, and a short-lived British edition (Wired UK). Wired UK was relaunched in April 2009. In 1994, John Battelle, cofounding editor, commissioned Jules Marshall to write a piece on the Zippies. The cover story broke records for being one of the most publicized stories of the year and was used to promote Wireds HotWired news service.

HotWired spawned websites Webmonkey, the search engine HotBot, and a weblog, Suck.com.  In June 1998, the magazine launched a stock index, the Wired Index, called the Wired 40 since July 2003.

The fortune of the magazine and allied enterprises corresponded closely to that of the dot-com bubble. In 1996, Rossetto and the other participants in Wired Ventures attempted to take the company public with an IPO. The initial attempt had to be withdrawn in the face of a downturn in the stock market, and especially the Internet sector, during the summer of 1996. The second try was also unsuccessful.

Rossetto and Metcalfe lost control of Wired Ventures to financial investors Providence Equity Partners in May 1998, which quickly sold off the company in pieces. Wired was purchased by Advance Publications, which assigned it to Advance's subsidiary, New York-based publisher Condé Nast Publications (while keeping Wireds editorial offices in San Francisco). Wired Digital (wired.com, hotbot.com, webmonkey.com, etc.) was purchased by Lycos and run independently from the rest of the magazine until 2006, when it was sold by Lycos to Advance Publications, returning the websites to the same company that published the magazine.

Anderson era

Wired survived the dot-com bubble and found new direction under editor-in-chief Chris Anderson in 2001, making the magazine's coverage "more mainstream". The print magazine's average page length, however, declined significantly from 1996 to 2001 and then again from 2001 to 2003.

Under Anderson, Wired has produced some widely noted articles, including the April 2003 "Welcome to the Hydrogen Economy" story, the November 2003 "Open Source Everywhere" issue (which put Linus Torvalds on the cover and articulated the idea that the open-source method was taking off outside of software, including encyclopedias as evidenced by Wikipedia), the February 2004 "Kiss Your Cubicle Goodbye" issue (which presented the outsourcing issue from both American and Indian perspectives), and an October 2004 article by Chris Anderson, which coined the popular term "the Long Tail".

The November 2004 issue of Wired was published with The Wired CD. All of the songs on the CD were released under various Creative Commons licenses in an attempt to push alternative copyright into the spotlight. Most of the songs were contributed by major artists, including the Beastie Boys, My Morning Jacket, Paul Westerberg, and David Byrne.

In 2005, Wired received the National Magazine Award for General Excellence in the category of 500,000 to 1,000,000 subscribers. That same year, Anderson won Advertising Age's editor of the year award. In May 2007, the magazine again won the National Magazine Award for General Excellence. In 2008, Wired was nominated for three National Magazine Awards and won the ASME for Design. It also took home 14 Society of Publication Design Awards, including the Gold for Magazine of the Year. In 2009, Wired was nominated for four National Magazine Awards – including General Excellence, Design, Best Section (Start), and Integration – and won three: General Excellence, Design, and Best Section (Start). David Rowan from Wired UK was awarded the BSME Launch of the Year 2009 Award. On December 14, 2009, Wired magazine was named Magazine of the Decade by the editors of Adweek.

In 2006, writer Jeff Howe and editor Mark Robinson coined the term "crowdsourcing" in the June issue. The magazine's average page length increased by 8 percent between September 2003 and September 2008.

In 2009, Condé Nast Italia launched the Italian edition of Wired and Wired.it. On April 2, 2009, Condé Nast relaunched the UK edition of Wired, edited by David Rowan, and launched Wired.co.uk. Also in 2009, Wired writer Evan Ratliff "vanished", attempting to keep his whereabouts secret, saying "I will try to stay hidden for 30 days." A $5,000 reward was offered to his finder(s). Ratliff was found September 8 in New Orleans by a team effort, which was written about by Ratliff in a later issue. In 2010, Wired released its tablet edition.

In 2012, Limor Fried of Adafruit Industries became the first female engineer featured on the cover of Wired.

In May 2013, Wired was included in Condé Nast Entertainment with the announcement of five original webseries, including the National Security Agency satire Codefellas and the animated advice series Mister Know-It-All.

Wired endorsed Democratic candidate Hillary Clinton in the run-up for the 2016 U.S. presidential election. This was the first time that the publication had ever endorsed a presidential candidate. In 2017, Nicholas Thompson became editor. The magazine won a National Magazine Award for design, launched a paywall, and became known for long investigative reports critiquing the tech industry. 

In 2022, Conde Nast's CEO Roger Lynch stated that "There’s certainly censorship that happens in China, but it’s really more about news, which is why we don’t operate any news", Lynch said. “We don’t operate The New Yorker there or Wired or Vanity Fair. We operate Vogue and GQ and titles that really are less about news because we can uphold our values and operate in that market.” Lynch also said that the company had no plans to cease operating in China as "we have brands that, from a Chinese government standpoint, I think [sic] align with the interests of the government, which is prosperity.”

Website
The Wired.com website, formerly known as Wired News and HotWired, launched in October 1994. The website and magazine were split in the late 1990s, when the latter was purchased by Condé Nast Publishing, Wired News (the website) was bought by Lycos not long after. The two remained independent until Condé Nast purchased Wired News on July 11, 2006, largely in response to declining profits. This move finally reunited the print and digital editions of Wired and both are currently (as of 2019) closely linked editorially.

As of February 2018, Wired.com is paywalled. Users may only access up to 4 articles per month without payment.

Today, Wired.com hosts several technology blogs on topics in security, business, new products, culture, and science. 

 NextFest

From 2004 to 2008, Wired organized an annual "festival of innovative products and technologies". A NextFest for 2009 was canceled.

 2004: May 14–16 at the Fort Mason Center, San Francisco
 2005: June 24–26 at Navy Pier, Chicago
 2006: September 28 – October 1 at the Jacob K. Javits Convention Center, New York City
 2007: September 13–16 at the Los Angeles Convention Center, Los Angeles
 2008: September 27 – October 12 at Millennium Park, Chicago

Supplement

Geekipedia is a supplement to Wired.

Contributors

Wireds writers have included Jorn Barger, John Perry Barlow, John Battelle, Paul Boutin, Stewart Brand, Gareth Branwyn, Po Bronson, Scott Carney, Michael Chorost, Douglas Coupland, James Daly, Joshua Davis, J. Bradford DeLong, Mark Dery, David Diamond, Cory Doctorow, Esther Dyson, Mark Frauenfelder, Simson Garfinkel, Samuel Gelerman, William Gibson, Dan Gillmor Mike Godwin, George Gilder, Lou Ann Hammond, Chris Hardwick, Virginia Heffernan, Danny Hillis, John Hodgman, Steven Johnson, Bill Joy, Richard Kadrey, Leander Kahney, Jon Katz, Jaron Lanier, Lawrence Lessig, Paul Levinson, Steven Levy, John Markoff, Wil McCarthy, Russ Mitchell, Glyn Moody, Belinda Parmar, Charles Platt, Josh Quittner, Spencer Reiss, Howard Rheingold, Rudy Rucker, Paul Saffo, Adam Savage, Evan Schwartz, Peter Schwartz, Steve Silberman, Alex Steffen, Neal Stephenson, Bruce Sterling, Kevin Warwick, Dave Winer, and Gary Wolf.

Guest editors have included director J. J. Abrams, filmmaker James Cameron, architect Rem Koolhaas, former US President Barack Obama, director Christopher Nolan, tennis player Serena Williams, and video game designer Will Wright.

See also
 Hack Canada (1998) organization run by hackers and phreakers
 Why the Future Doesn't Need Us
 Whole Internet User's Guide and Catalog
 The New Yorker

References

Further reading
 "Wired UK: what nearly happened", an article on the rise and fall of Wired UK

External links

 
  of Wired Italy 
  of Wired Japan 
  of Wired UK

 
1993 establishments in California
1993 in San Francisco
Computer magazines published in the United States
Lifestyle magazines published in the United States
Monthly magazines published in the United States
Science and technology magazines published in the United States
Condé Nast magazines
Magazines established in 1993
Magazines published in San Francisco
South of Market, San Francisco
Webby Award winners
Whole Earth Catalog